"Lay Me Down" is a 2010 single by reggae rock band Dirty Heads featuring Rome Ramirez of Sublime with Rome. The song appears as a bonus track on the band's album Any Port in a Storm, and has peaked at number one on the Billboard Alternative Songs chart.

Critical reception
Billboard's Connor McKnight  wrote in April 2010 that the song is a "solid contender" for song of the summer. McKnight compared the song's opening to that of "Hope" by Jack Johnson, and said the song "lifts the energy with chugging guitar riffs, a freewheeling chorus and feel-good lyrics delivered with rhythmic punch". David Hall of the Orange County Register listed it among the band's "positively charged, island-influenced tunes ... which ride on the coattails of similar acts like 311 and Slightly Stoopid". The song was included on Rolling Stone'''s "Hot List" in early 2010.

Chart performance
In March, the single entered the Billboard Alternative Songs chart at number 24. It reached number one in May, and nine weeks later it established a record as the song with the longest stint atop the chart for an independently released title, surpassing the previous mark set in 1999 by Everlast's "What It's Like". "Lay Me Down" peaked at number 93 on the U.S. Hot 100 and number 76 on the Canadian Hot 100 chart. The Dirty Heads performed the song on Jimmy Kimmel Live!'' on May 13.

Music video
The music video was directed by Thomas Mignone and filmed in various playa and mercado locations throughout Mexico. Filming was interrupted by border patrol agents objecting to the actors' portrayal of escaping across the United States and Mexico border. Bandmembers Dustin Bushnell and Jared Watson taught local mariachis the song and were filmed live for several of the scenes.

Charts

Weekly charts

Year-end charts

Decade-end charts

See also
List of number-one alternative rock singles of 2010 (U.S.)
List of number-one rock singles (U.S.)

References

External links
 
"Lay Me Down" on The Dirty Heads' YouTube channel

2009 songs
2010 singles
Reggae rock songs
Universal Music Group singles
Songs written by Rome Ramirez